In Judaism, the Seven Laws of Noah (Sheva Mitzvot B'nei Noach), otherwise referred to as the Noahide Laws or the Noachian Laws (from the Hebrew pronunciation of "Noah"), are a set of universal moral laws which, according to the Talmud, were given by God as a covenant with Noah and with the "sons of Noah"—that is, all of humanity.

The Seven Laws of Noah include prohibitions against worshipping idols, cursing God, murder, adultery and sexual immorality, theft, eating flesh torn from a living animal, as well as the obligation to establish courts of justice.

According to modern Jewish law, non-Jews (gentiles) are not obligated to convert to Judaism, but they are required to observe the Seven Laws of Noah to be assured of a place in the World to Come (Olam Ha-Ba), the final reward of the righteous. The non-Jews that choose to follow the Seven Laws of Noah are regarded as "Righteous Gentiles" (Chassiddei Umot ha-Olam: "Pious People of the World").

The Seven Laws 
The seven Noahide laws as traditionally enumerated in the Babylonian Talmud Sanhedrin 56a-b and Tosefta Avodah Zarah 9:4, are the following:

Not to worship idols.
Not to curse God.
Not to commit murder.
Not to commit adultery or sexual immorality.
Not to steal.
Not to eat flesh torn from a living animal.
To establish courts of justice.

According to the Talmud, the seven laws were given first to Adam and subsequently to Noah. However, the Tannaitic and Amoraitic rabbinic sages (1st–6th centuries CE) disagreed on the exact number of Noahide laws that were originally given to Adam. Six of the seven laws were exegetically derived from passages in the Book of Genesis, with the seventh being the establishment of courts of justice.

The earliest complete rabbinic version of the seven Noahide laws can be found in the Tosefta:

Origins

Biblical sources 
According to the Genesis flood narrative, a deluge covered the whole world on account of violent corruption on the earth, killing every surface-dwelling creature except Noah, his wife, his sons, their wives, and the animals taken aboard the Ark. According to the biblical narrative, all modern humans are descendants of Noah, thus the name Noahide Laws refers to the laws that apply to all of humanity. After the Flood, God sealed a covenant with Noah with the following admonitions as written in Genesis 9:4-6:
 Flesh of a living animal: "However, flesh with its life-blood [in it], you shall not eat." (9:4)
 Murder and courts: "Furthermore, I will demand your blood, for [the taking of] your lives, I shall demand it [even] from any wild animal. From man too, I will demand of each person's brother the blood of man. He who spills the blood of man, by man his blood shall be spilt; for in the image of God He made man." (9:5–6)

Book of Jubilees 
The Book of Jubilees, generally dated to the 1st century BCE, may include a substantially different list of six commandments at verses 7:20–25:
(1) to observe righteousness; 
(2) to cover the shame of their flesh; 
(3) to bless their creator; 
(4) to honor their parents; 
(5) to love their neighbor; and 
(6) to guard against fornication, uncleanness, and all iniquity.

Modern scholarship

Rabbinical views 

The Encyclopedia Talmudit, edited by rabbi Shlomo Yosef Zevin, states that after the giving of the Torah, the Jewish people were no longer included in the category of the sons of Noah; however, Maimonides (Mishneh Torah, Hilkhot M'lakhim 9:1) indicates that the seven commandments are also part of the Torah, and the Babylonian Talmud (Sanhedrin 59a, see also Tosafot ad. loc.) states that Jews are obligated in all things that gentiles are obligated in, albeit with some differences in the details. According to the Encyclopedia Talmudit, most medieval Jewish authorities considered that all the seven commandments were given to Adam, although Maimonides (Mishneh Torah, Hilkhot M'lakhim 9:1) considered the dietary law to have been given to Noah.

Menachem Mendel Schneerson, the Lubavitcher Rebbe, published and spoke about the Seven Laws of Noah many times. According to Schneerson's view, based on a detailed reading of Maimonides' Hilkhot M'lakhim, the Talmud, and the Hebrew Bible, the seven laws originally given to Noah were given yet again, through Moses at Sinai, and it's exclusively through the giving of the Torah that the seven laws derive their current force. What has changed with the giving of the Torah is that now, it is the duty of the Jewish people to bring the rest of the world to fulfill the Seven Laws of Noah.

Academic and secular analysis 
According to Michael S. Kogan, professor of philosophy and religious studies at Montclair State University, the Seven Laws of Noah aren't explicitly mentioned in the Torah but were exegetically extrapolated from the Book of Genesis by 2nd-century rabbis, which wrote them down in the Tosefta.

According to Adam J. Silverstein, professor of Middle Eastern studies and Islamic studies at the Hebrew University of Jerusalem, Jewish theologians started to rethink the relevance and applicability of the Seven Laws of Noah during the Middle Ages, primarily due to the precarious living conditions of the Jewish people under the Medieval Christian kingdoms and the Islamic world (see Jewish–Christian relations and Jewish–Islamic relations), since both Christians and Muslims recognize the patriarch Abraham as the unifying figure of the Abrahamic tradition, alongside the monotheistic conception of God. Silverstein states that Jewish theology came to include concepts and frameworks that would permit certain types of non-Jews to be recognized as righteous and deserving of life in the Hereafter due to the "Noachide Law". He sees there being two "Torahs": one for Jews, the other for the gentile "Children of Noah". Whilst theoretically the Noachide Law should be universal, its prohibitions against blasphemy and idolatry mean that in practise it only really applied to non-idolatrous theists. Therefore Jews normally considered Christians and/or Muslims when discussing this concept.

David Novak, professor of Jewish theology and ethics at the University of Toronto, presents a range of theories regarding the sources from which the Seven Laws of Noah originated, including the Hebrew Bible itself, Hittite laws, the Maccabean period, and the Roman period. Regarding the modern Noahide movement, he denounced it by stating that "If Jews are telling Gentiles what to do, it’s a form of imperialism".

Judaism

Talmud 
According to the Talmud, the Noahide laws apply to all of humanity. In Judaism, the term B'nei Noach ("Sons of Noah") refers to all mankind. The Talmud also states: "Righteous people of all nations have a share in the world to come". Any non-Jew who lives according to these laws is regarded as one of the righteous among the gentiles. According to the Talmud, the seven laws were given first to Adam and subsequently to Noah. Six of the seven laws were exegetically derived from passages in the Book of Genesis, with the seventh being the establishment of courts of justice.

The Talmudic sages expanded the concept of universal morality within the Noahide laws and added several other laws beyond the seven listed in the Talmud and Tosefta which are attributed to different rabbis, such as prohibitions against committing incest, cruelty to animals, pairing animals of different species, grafting trees of different kinds, castration, emasculation, homosexuality, pederasty, and sorcery among others, with some of the sages, such as Ulla, going so far as to make a list of 30 laws. The Talmud expands the scope of the seven laws to cover about 100 of the 613 mitzvot.

Punishment 

In practice, Jewish law makes it very difficult to apply the death penalty. No record exists of a gentile having been put to death for violating the seven Noahide laws. Some of the categories of capital punishment recorded in the Talmud are recorded as having never been carried out. It is thought that the rabbis included discussion of them in anticipation of the coming Messianic Age.

The Talmud lists the punishment for blaspheming the Ineffable Name of God as death. According Sanhedrin 56a, for Noahides convicted of a capital crime, the only sanctioned method of execution is decapitation, considered one of the lightest capital punishments. Other sources state that the execution is to be by stoning if he has intercourse with a Jewish betrothed woman, or by strangulation if the Jewish woman has completed the marriage ceremonies, but had not yet consummated the marriage. In Jewish law, the only form of blasphemy which is punishable by death is blaspheming the Ineffable Name. Some Talmudic rabbis held that only those offences for which a Jew would be executed, are forbidden to gentiles. The Talmudic rabbis discuss which offences and sub-offences are capital offences and which are merely forbidden.

Maimonides states that anyone who does not accept the seven laws is to be executed, as God compelled the world to follow these laws. However, for the other prohibitions such as the grafting of trees and bestiality he holds that the sons of Noah are not to be executed. Maimonides adds a universalism lacking from earlier Jewish sources. The Talmud differs from Maimonides in that it considers the seven laws enforceable by Jewish authorities on non-Jews living within a Jewish nation. Nahmanides disagrees with Maimonides' reasoning. He limits the obligation of enforcing the seven laws to non-Jewish authorities, thus taking the matter out of Jewish hands. The Tosafot seems to agree with Nahmanides reasoning. According to some opinions, punishment is the same whether the individual transgresses with knowledge of the law or is ignorant of the law.

Some authorities debate whether non-Jewish societies may decide to modify the Noachide laws of evidence (for example, by requiring more witnesses before punishment, or by permitting circumstantial evidence) if they consider that to be more just. Whilst Jewish law requires two witnesses, Noachide law, as recorded by Rambam, Hilkhot Melakhim 9:14, can accept the testimony of a single eyewitness as sufficient for use of the death penalty. Whilst a confession of guilt is not admissible as evidence before a Jewish court, it is a matter of considerable dispute as to whether or not it constitutes sufficient grounds for conviction in Noachide courts.

Subdivisions 
Various rabbinic sources have different positions on the way the seven laws are to be subdivided in categories. Maimonides', in his Mishneh Torah, included the grafting of trees. Like the Talmud, he interpreted the prohibition against homicide as including a prohibition against abortion. David ben Solomon ibn Abi Zimra, a commentator on Maimonides, expressed surprise that he left out castration and sorcery which were also listed in the Talmud.

The Talmudist Ulla said that here are 30 laws which the sons of Noah took upon themselves. However, he only lists three, namely the three that the gentiles follow: not to create a Ketubah between males, not to sell carrion or human flesh in the market and to respect the Torah. The rest of the laws are not listed. Though the authorities seem to take it for granted that Ulla's thirty commandments included the original seven, an additional thirty laws are also possible from the reading. Two different lists of the 30 laws exist. Both lists include an additional twenty-three mitzvot which are subdivisions or extensions of the seven laws. One from the 16th-century work Asarah Maamarot by Rabbi Menahem Azariah da Fano and a second from the 10th century Samuel ben Hofni which was recently published from his Judeo-Arabic writings after having been found in the Cairo Geniza. Rabbi Zvi Hirsch Chajes suggests Menahem Azariah of Fano enumerated commandments are not related to the first seven, nor based on Scripture, but instead were passed down by oral tradition.

Ger toshav (resident alien) 

During biblical times, a gentile living in the Land of Israel who did not want to convert to Judaism but accepted the Seven Laws of Noah as binding upon himself was granted the legal status of ger toshav (ger: "foreigner" or "alien" + toshav: "resident", lit. "resident alien"). A ger toshav is therefore commonly deemed a "Righteous Gentile" (Chassid Umot ha-Olam: "Pious People of the World"), and is assured of a place in the World to Come (Olam Ha-Ba).

The rabbinic regulations regarding Jewish-gentile relations are modified in the case of a ger toshav. The accepted halakhic opinion is that the ger toshav must accept the seven Noahide laws in the presence of three haberim (men of authority), or, according to the rabbinic tradition, before a beth din (Jewish rabbinical court). He will receive certain legal protection and privileges from the Jewish community, and there is an obligation to render him aid when in need. The restrictions on having a gentile do work for a Jew on the Shabbat are also greater when the gentile is a ger toshav.

According to the Jewish philosopher and professor Menachem Kellner's study on Maimonidean texts (1991), a ger toshav could be a transitional stage on the way to becoming a "righteous alien" (ger tzedek), i.e. a full convert to Judaism. He conjectures that, according to Maimonides, only a full ger tzedek would be found during the Messianic era. Furthermore, Kellner criticizes the assumption within Orthodox Judaism that there is an "ontological divide between Jews and Gentiles", which he believes is contrary to what Maimonides thought and the Torah teaches, stating that "Gentiles as well as Jews are fully created in the image of God".

Maimonides' view and his critics 
During the Golden Age of Jewish culture in the Iberian Peninsula, the medieval Jewish philosopher and rabbi Maimonides (1135–1204) wrote in the halakhic legal code Mishneh Torah that gentiles must perform exclusively the Seven Laws of Noah and refrain from studying the Torah or performing any Jewish commandment, including resting on the Shabbat; however, Maimonides also states that if gentiles want to perform any Jewish commandment besides the Seven Laws of Noah according to the correct halakhic procedure, they are not prevented from doing so. According to Maimonides, teaching non-Jews to follow the Seven Laws of Noah is incumbent on all Jews, a commandment in and of itself. Nevertheless, the majority of rabbinic authorities over the centuries have rejected Maimonides' opinion, and the dominant halakhic consensus has always been that Jews are not required to spread the Noahide laws to non-Jews.

Maimonides held that gentiles may have a part in the World to Come (Olam Ha-Ba) just by observing the Seven Laws of Noah and accepting them as divinely revealed to Moses. According to Maimonides, such non-Jews achieve the status of Chassid Umot Ha-Olam ("Pious People of the World"), and are different from those which solely keep the Noahide laws out of moral/ethical reasoning alone. He wrote in Hilkhot M'lakhim:"

Some later editions of the Mishneh Torah differ by one letter and read "Nor one of their wise men"; the latter reading is narrower. In either reading, Maimonides appears to exclude philosophical Noahides from being "Righteous Gentiles". According to him, a truly "Righteous Gentile" follows the seven laws because they are divinely revealed, and thus are followed out of obedience to God.

The 15th-century Sephardic Orthodox rabbi Yosef Caro, one of the early Acharonim and author of the Shulchan Aruch, rejected Maimonides' denial of the access to the World to Come to the gentiles who obey the Noahide laws guided only by their reason as anti-rationalistic and unfounded, asserting that there isn't any justification to uphold such a view in the Talmud. The 17th-century Sephardic philosopher Baruch Spinoza read Maimonides as using "nor", and accused him of being narrow and particularistic. Other Jewish philosophers influenced by Spinoza, such as Moses Mendelssohn and Hermann Cohen, also have formulated more inclusive and universal interpretations of the Seven Laws of Noah.

Moses Mendelssohn, one of the leading exponents of the Jewish enlightenment (Haskalah), strongly disagreed with Maimonides' opinion, and instead contended that gentiles which observe the Noahide laws out of ethical, moral, or philosophical reasoning, without believing in the Jewish monotheistic conception of God, retained the status of "Righteous Gentiles" and would still achieve salvation. According to Steven Schwarzschild, Maimonides' position has its source in his adoption of Aristotle's skeptical attitude towards the ability of reason to arrive at moral truths, and "many of the most outstanding spokesmen of Judaism themselves dissented sharply from" this position, which is "individual and certainly somewhat eccentric" in comparison to other Jewish thinkers.

A novel understanding of Maimonides' position in the 20th century, advanced by the Ashkenazi Orthodox rabbi Abraham Isaac Kook, is that a non-Jew who follows the commandments due to philosophical conviction rather than revelation (what Maimonides calls "one of their wise men") also merits the World to Come; this would be in line with Maimonides' general approach that following philosophical wisdom advances a person more than following revelatory commands.

Modern Noahide movement

Menachem Mendel Schneerson encouraged his followers on many occasions to preach the Seven Laws of Noah, devoting some of his addresses to the subtleties of this code. Since the 1990s, Orthodox Jewish rabbis from Israel, most notably those affiliated to Chabad-Lubavitch and religious Zionist organizations, including The Temple Institute, have set up a modern Noahide movement. These Noahide organizations, led by religious Zionist and Orthodox rabbis, are aimed at non-Jews to proselytize among them and commit them to follow the Noahide laws. However, these religious Zionist and Orthodox rabbis that guide the modern Noahide movement, who are often affiliated with the Third Temple movement, are accused of expounding a racist and supremacist ideology which consists in the belief that the Jewish people are God's chosen nation and racially superior to non-Jews, and mentor Noahides because they believe that the Messianic era will begin with the rebuilding of the Third Temple on the Temple Mount in Jerusalem to re-institute the Jewish priesthood along with the practice of ritual sacrifices, and the establishment of a Jewish theocracy in Israel, supported by communities of Noahides. In 1990, Meir Kahane was the keynote speaker at the First International Conference of the Descendants of Noah, the first Noahide gathering, in Fort Worth, Texas. After the assassination of Meir Kahane that same year, The Temple Institute, which advocates to rebuild the Third Jewish Temple on the Temple Mount in Jerusalem, started to promote the Noahide laws as well.

Public recognition
In the 1980s, Menachem Mendel Schneerson urged his followers to actively engage in activities to inform non-Jews about the Noahide laws, which had not been done in previous generations. The Chabad-Lubavitch movement has been one of the most active in Noahide outreach, believing that there is spiritual and societal value for non-Jews in at least simply acknowledging the Noahide laws.

In 1982, Chabad-Lubavitch had a reference to the Noahide laws enshrined in a U.S. Presidential proclamation: the "Proclamation 4921", signed by the then-U.S. President Ronald Reagan. The United States Congress, recalling House Joint Resolution 447 and in celebration of Schneerson's 80th birthday, proclaimed 4 April 1982, as a "National Day of Reflection."

In 1989 and 1990, Chabad-Lubavitch had another reference to the Noahide laws enshrined in a U.S. Presidential proclamation: the "Proclamation 5956", signed by then-U.S. President George H. W. Bush. The United States Congress, recalling House Joint Resolution 173 and in celebration of Schneerson's 87th birthday, proclaimed 16 April 1989, and 6 April 1990, as "Education Day, U.S.A.".

In January 2004, the spiritual leader of the Druze community in Israel, Sheikh Mowafak Tarif, met with a representative of Chabad-Lubavitch to sign a declaration calling on all non-Jews in Israel to observe the Noahide laws; the mayor of the Arab city of Shefa-'Amr (Shfaram) — where Muslim, Christian, and Druze communities live side-by-side – also signed the document.

In March 2016, the Sephardic Chief Rabbi of Israel, Yitzhak Yosef, declared during a sermon that Jewish law requires that only non-Jews who follow the Noahide laws are allowed to live in Israel: "According to Jewish law, it’s forbidden for a non-Jew to live in the Land of Israel – unless he has accepted the seven Noahide laws, [...] If the non-Jew is unwilling to accept these laws, then we can send him to Saudi Arabia, ... When there will be full, true redemption, we will do this." Yosef further added: "non-Jews shouldn’t live in the land of Israel. ... If our hand were firm, if we had the power to rule, then non-Jews must not live in Israel. But, our hand is not firm. [...] Who, otherwise be the servants? Who will be our helpers? This is why we leave them in Israel." Yosef’s sermon sparked outrage in Israel and was fiercely criticized by several human rights associations, NGOs and members of the Knesset; Jonathan Greenblatt, Anti-Defamation League's CEO and national director, and Carole Nuriel, Anti-Defamation League’s Israel Office acting director, issued a strong denunciation of Yosef’s sermon:

Contemporary status 
Historically, some rabbinic opinions consider non-Jews not only not obliged to adhere to all the remaining laws of the Torah, but actually forbidden from observing them.

Noahide law differs radically from Roman law for gentiles (Jus Gentium), if only because the latter was enforceable judicial policy. Rabbinic Judaism has never adjudicated any cases under the Noahide laws, Jewish scholars disagree about whether the Noahide laws are a functional part of the Halakha (Jewish law).

Some modern views hold that penalties are a detail of the Noahide Laws and that Noahides themselves must determine the details of their own laws for themselves. According to this school of thought – see N. Rakover, Law and the Noahides (1998); M. Dallen, The Rainbow Covenant (2003) – the Noahide laws offer humankind a set of absolute values and a framework for righteousness and justice, while the detailed laws that are currently on the books of the world's states and nations are presumptively valid.

In recent years, the term "Noahide" has come to refer to non-Jews who strive to live in accord with the seven Noahide Laws; the terms "observant Noahide" or "Torah-centered Noahides" would be more precise but these are infrequently used. Support for the use of "Noahide" in this sense can be found with the Ritva, who uses the term Son of Noah to refer to a gentile who keeps the seven laws, but is not a ger toshav.

Early Christianity 

In the history of Christianity, the Apostolic Decree recorded in Acts 15 is commonly seen as a parallel to the Seven Laws of Noah, and thus be a commonality rather than a differential. However, modern scholars dispute the connection between Acts 15 and the seven Noahide laws. The Apostolic Decree is still observed by the Eastern Orthodox Church and includes some food restrictions.

The Jewish Encyclopedia article on Paul of Tarsus states:

The article on the New Testament states:

The 18th-century rabbi Jacob Emden hypothesized that Jesus, and Paul after him, intended to convert the gentiles to the Seven Laws of Noah while calling on the Jews to keep the full Law of Moses.

See also 

 Code of Hammurabi
 Ethical monotheism
 Forbidden relationships in Judaism
 God-fearers
 Interfaith dialogue
 Jewish Christians
 Jewish outreach
 Judaism and environmentalism
 Judaizers
 List of ancient legal codes
 Natural law
 Proselytization and counter-proselytization of Jews
 Relations between Judaism and Christianity
 Relations between Judaism and Islam
 Righteous among the Nations
 Ritual Decalogue
 Shituf
 Subbotniks
 Ten Commandments

References

Further reading

External links 
 
 
 
 
 

 7 (number)
Biblical law
Codes of conduct
Jewish ethical law
Jewish law and rituals
Judaism and nature
Judaism and society
Judeo-Christian topics
Land of Israel laws in Judaism
Law and morality
Negative Mitzvoth
Noach (parashah)
Noah
Noahides
Talmud concepts and terminology
Virtue ethics
Book of Jubilees